Geoffrey Grenville Finch (7 October 1923; 31 March 1984) was Archdeacon of Basingstoke from 1971  until  1982.

Finch was educated at Quarry Bank High School, St Peter's College, Oxford, Wycliffe Hall, Oxford; and Wells Theological College. He was ordained in 1950.  After a curacy in Wigan he held incumbencies in Westleigh, New Milton and Preston Candover.

Notes

1923 births
People educated at Quarry Bank High School
Alumni of St Peter's College, Oxford
Archdeacons of Basingstoke
1984 deaths